Lindsay Shepherd (born 7 December 1994) is a Canadian columnist who became known for her involvement, as a graduate student and teaching assistant, in an academic freedom controversy at Wilfrid Laurier University (WLU) in Waterloo, Ontario, in 2017.

In November 2017, Shepherd played her communications class two clips of a debate, formerly aired on Canadian public broadcaster TVOntario, with psychologist Jordan Peterson on Bill C-16, which added "gender identity or expression" as a prohibited ground for discrimination to the Canadian Human Rights Act and as an identifiable group to the Criminal Code. After one student approached a campus LGBTQ support group to express concern about the clips, they contacted the University's acting manager of gender violence prevention, and Shepherd's supervisor requested that she attend a meeting the following day with him, a support group staffer, and the head of Shepherd's academic program. Without detailing the nature of the complaint or complaints, Shepherd was accused of having created a "toxic climate for some of the students" by playing the clips and adopting a neutral stance between the positions.

An independent fact-finder hired by the university reported that the meeting should not have taken place, that "no formal complaint, nor informal concern relative to a Laurier policy" had been registered, and that Shepherd had done nothing wrong by showing the clips.

In May that year Shepherd received the 2018 Harry Weldon Canadian Values Award from Canadians for Accountability. The following month she filed a lawsuit against the university, the two professors, the third staff member and a student, alleging "harassment, intentional infliction of nervous shock, negligence, and constructive dismissal". Peterson also filed a lawsuit, for defamation, against the university and the staff members in the meeting.

Early life and education
Shepherd was raised in a non-religious household. Her mother teaches elementary school and her father is a youth counsellor. She attended Cariboo Hill Secondary School, Burnaby, before completing her undergraduate degree in communication at Simon Fraser University in Vancouver. In 2018 she received a Master of Arts degree in cultural analysis and social theory from Wilfrid Laurier University (WLU), after joining the graduate program in September 2017.

Wilfrid Laurier University incident

Class
On 1 November 2017, Shepherd was teaching a WLU first-year undergraduate class, "Canadian Communication in Context". Discussing grammar and pronouns, she showed the class one two-minute clip and a second three-minute clip from The Agenda with Steve Paikin, a current-affairs program produced by TVOntario, a publicly funded channel. 

The first clip featured the host, Steve Paikin, discussing gender-neutral pronouns with Jordan Peterson, a psychology professor at the University of Toronto. A critic of Bill C-16 and "what he sees as an intolerant left-wing [sic] in higher education", according to The Globe and Mail, Peterson was arguing against being legally compelled to use pronouns such as zie and zher or the singular they. He told Paikin that he was being asked "to use a certain set of words that I think are the constructions of people who have a political ideology that I don't believe in and that I also regard as dangerous", and described it as an "attempt to control language in a direction that isn't happening organically ... but by force and by fiat". In the second clip from the same debate, Peterson discussed the issues with Nicholas Matte, a historian who teaches in the Sexual Diversity Studies program at Toronto. Matte told Peterson: "I don't care about your language use. I care about the safety of people being harmed."

After the clips were shown, a heated discussion took place among students in the class, some supportive of Peterson and others critical; one told a college newspaper that students had used the discussion "as an excuse to make fun of trans identities".

Meeting
According to Toby Finlay, an administrator with the university's Rainbow Centre, an LGBTQ support group, one student approached them with an expression of concern about the clips. The Rainbow Centre then spoke to Adria Joel, acting manager of gender violence prevention in the university's Diversity and Equity Office. On 7 November 2017 Nathan Rambukkana, Shepherd's supervisor, emailed Shepherd to ask that she attend a meeting the following day with him, Joel, and Herbert Pimlott, head of Shepherd's academic program. Shepherd's mother suggested that she record the discussion; the other participants did not know they were being recorded. Citing confidentiality, they did not show Shepherd the complaint, say who had complained, or explain how many complaints there had been; she was told only that "one or multiple students had come forward" expressing concern.

During the 40-minute meeting, Shepherd was accused of having created a "toxic climate for some of the students" by playing the clips and adopting a neutral stance between the positions. Shepherd argued that students must be exposed to mainstream ideas, and that the ideas should be presented without taking sides. The professor compared the pronoun debate to discussing whether a student of color should have rights; that is, it is "not something intellectually neutral that is up for debate". Shepherd responded that the matter at hand was indeed "out there" and up for debate. Arguing that the ideas had been presented as a valid perspective, the professor compared the Peterson clip to "neutrally playing a speech by Hitler or Milo Yiannopoulos from Gamergate." Presenting such material devoid of criticism was "diametrically opposed to everything that we've been talking about in the lectures", he said.

The professor added that Peterson's arguments were "counter to the Canadian Human Rights Code ", and that what had happened in class had been contrary to the university's Gendered and Sexual Violence Policy; the manager offered the view that it might have violated the Ontario Human Rights Code.

The meeting ended with Rambukkana asking that Shepherd send him her lesson plan prior to each class because there had been a breakdown in communication. This was the extent of her punishment, but Rambukkana said that he wasn't sure what else might happen going forward and that he had to discuss the matter with other members of the faculty.

Recording released, apologies
Shepherd released the recording to the National Post, as well as to a local newspaper and another on Canada's west coast. The National Post contacted her immediately, and Christie Blatchford wrote an opinion piece in the Post on 10 November. WLU's president, Deborah MacLatchy, and Professor Nathan Rambukkana published letters of apology on 21 November. MacLatchy said of the meeting that it "does not reflect the values and practices to which Laurier aspires". In his apology, Rambukkana said he should have done more to support Shepherd as her course director and supervisor, and that he had reconsidered some of his positions since the meeting. He wrote that he regretted comparing Peterson to Hitler, which was "untrue and was never my intention".

University inquiry

The university asked a lawyer, Robert Centa, to conduct an independent investigation. His report, which the university did not release, found that Shepherd had not violated university policies and that the meeting had involved "significant overreach". On 18 December 2017 the university president, Deborah MacLatchy, issued a statement saying that there had been "numerous errors in judgement made in the handling of the meeting". The meeting should not have taken place, she wrote, because "[n]o formal complaint, nor informal concern relative to a Laurier policy, was registered about the screening of the video." She concluded that there had been "no wrongdoing on the part of Ms. Shepherd in showing the clip from TVO in her tutorial".

According to MacLatchy, the information about the class had been received via a staff member in the Rainbow Centre "from students who had been on campus talking about it. The policy was not designed to deal with those kind of comments and concerns not actually being raised through the process." In April 2018 she repeated that whatever issue had been raised about the clips, it "was not a complaint as the term is defined in the university’s Gendered and Sexual Violence Policy, which Mr. Centa reviewed in establishing his findings".

Lawsuits
In June 2018, Shepherd filed a lawsuit against the university, Rambukkana, Pimlott, Joel, and a graduate student for damages of $3.6 million, claiming "harassment, intentional infliction of nervous shock, negligence, and constructive dismissal". On 18 June that year, Peterson filed a $1.5-million defamation lawsuit against Laurier, Rambukkana, Pimlott, and Joel. His statement of claim alleges that he was compared to Hitler and portrayed as "sexist, misogynist, dangerous and racist" during the November 2017 meeting. In December 2018, Rambukkana and Pimlott filed a third-party claim against Shepherd, alleging she had had control over the recording and should therefore be liable for any damages Peterson suffered as a result of its publication.

Subsequent activism
After the incident, Shepherd gave multiple interviews, including to newspapers and CBC News, as well as on YouTube shows such the Dave Rubin Report and Louder with Crowder, discussing the implications for free speech and academic freedom. She remained active online, gathering over 30,000 Twitter followers by December 2017.  She appears in the 2019 documentary No Safe Spaces.

A May 2018 Boston Herald editorial identified Shepherd as one of a group of intellectuals described as the intellectual dark web. On 7 February 2019, the Justice Centre for Constitutional Freedoms announced that Shepherd was joining the Justice Centre as a "Campus Free Speech Fellow".  As of December 2019, Shepherd has worked with the True North Centre for Public Policy.

On 14 July 2019 Shepherd was banned from Twitter due to an exchange with Jessica Yaniv on the social media platform. In their exchange Yaniv said "I heard @realDonaldTrump is building a wall inside of your uterus aka your ‘reproductive abnormality’ hopefully the wall works as intended", to which Shepherd responded "At least I have a uterus, you fat ugly man". Shepherd said she would look to using other platforms, possibly including Thinkspot, a platform proposed by Jordan Peterson. Shepherd's Twitter was reinstated later in July 2019.

Bibliography

Awards
Shepherd received the Harry Weldon Canadian Values Award in May 2018 from Canadians for Accountability for her free-speech advocacy.

Personal life
Shepherd is married and had her first child in April 2019. She is a vegetarian.

Notes

References

External links
 
 
 
 identitygrifting.ca, website operated by Lindsay Shepherd
 

21st-century Canadian educators
21st-century women educators
Canadian anti-communists
Canadian women activists
Critics of postmodernism
Free speech activists
Living people
Simon Fraser University alumni
Wilfrid Laurier University alumni
1994 births